Leonardo Adoly Morales López (born October 8, 1975) is a retired Honduran footballer.

Club career
Morales had played for Real España, Marathón and Hispano, before finishing his career at Vida, in the Liga Nacional de Honduras.

International career
Morales made his debut for Honduras in a November 1999 friendly match against Trinidad & Tobago and has earned a total of 5 caps, scoring no goals. He has represented his country in 1 FIFA World Cup qualification match and played at the 2001 Copa América.

His final international was a July 2001 Copa America match against Uruguay.

References

External links

1975 births
Living people
People from Colón Department (Honduras)
Association football defenders
Honduran footballers
Honduras international footballers
2001 Copa América players
Real C.D. España players
C.D.S. Vida players
C.D. Marathón players
Hispano players
Liga Nacional de Fútbol Profesional de Honduras players